Underwater speed record include records for submarines, autonomous underwater vehicles, and torpedos.  As these are typically for military vehicles, most are unconfirmed.

Submarines
Established reports and manufacturer's claims indicate that a handful of submarines are capable of speeds exceeding . There are also claims that the Soviet twin-propeller submarine K-222, with titanium inner and outer hulls, reached , fully submerged, during sea trials in 1969.

Torpedos
The German press reported on an underwater anti-torpedo missile, formerly named Barracuda, allegedly capable of reaching .

References

Water speed records